The Tumansky M-87 was a Soviet air-cooled aircraft radial engine that was developed in the late 1930s. It was a development of their licensed Gnome-Rhone 14K engines that started with the M-85.

Development
In 1934, USSR licensed the French Gnome-Rhone 14K aircraft engine producing 800 hp (595 kW), which entered production as the M-85. The engine was subsequently modified to M-86 which produced 960 hp (715 kW) at takeoff thanks to increased supercharging and a higher compression ratio. The M-87 was created to further increase the power output. Cylinders and pistons were revised to increase the compression ratio and the supercharger was redesigned. The resulting engine had better high-altitude performance and entered production in 1938. However, the engine proved unreliable and suffered from failure of gears in the reduction gearbox.  Later the M-88 was designed to address the shortcomings of the M-87.  At first the M-88 was not a success, but the designers persisted, and the M-88 was made into a reliable and widely produced engine.  The M-87 was used in Ilyushin Il-4 and Sukhoi Su-2 bombers, and the Polikarpov I-180 fighter.

Specifications (M-87)

See also

References

1930s aircraft piston engines
Aircraft air-cooled radial piston engines
Tumansky aircraft engines